USNS Private Joe E. Mann (T-AK-253) was a  acquired in 1950, from the U.S. Army, where she was known as the USAT Private Joe E. Mann.

Richfield served on the Pacific Missile Range, based out of California, and was placed out of service in 1968.

Victory ship constructed in California
Private Joe E. Mann (AK–253) was laid down, under U.S. Maritime Commission contract, as Owensboro Victory (MCV hull 719) by the Permanente Metals Corporation, Yard #2, Richmond, California, 12 June 1945; launched 21 July 1945; sponsored by Mrs. Robert A. Nieman; and delivered to the Maritime Commission, thence to Coastwise Lines for operation, 27 August 1945.

Post-World War II commercial service
A month and a half after delivery, Owensboro Victory departed San Francisco, California, carrying cargo and passengers to occupied Japan. In December, she sailed for the United States, via the Suez Canal, and arrived in Boston, Massachusetts, 7 February 1946.

Shifting to New York City, the following month, she made cargo runs to European ports until returned to the U.S. Maritime Commission in September, for transfer to the Army Transportation Service.

U.S. Army service
Renamed USAT Private Joe E. Mann, 31 October 1947, she served the Army until she was again returned to the Maritime Commission and simultaneously transferred to the Navy, 7 August 1950.

U.S. Navy service
Designated T-AK–253, the Victory ship was manned by a civil service crew and operated under Military Sea Transportation Service (MSTS) as a cargo ship until October 1958.

Conversion to a missile tracking ship

Then fitted out as a missile range instrumentation ship, she was reassigned by MSTS to the Pacific Missile Range. Private Joe E. Mann served as a telemetry ship for the early Corona surveillance satellite missions (as early as Discoverer 8, November 1959) through the flight of Discoverer 13 (August 1960). Renamed and reclassified USNS Richfield (AGM–4) on 27 November 1960, she operated off the California coast, in cooperation with the U.S. Air Force.

Final inactivation
Richfield continued her missile tracking until transferred to the Maritime Administration, 21 November 1968, when she was berthed with the National Defense Reserve Fleet at Suisun Bay, Benicia, California.

She was sold for scrapping, 16 March 1976, to Nicolai Joffe, and then withdrawn from the Reserve Fleet and delivered to Nicolai Joffe, 12 April 1976.

See also
Missile Range Instrumentation Ship

References

 NavSource Online: Service Ship Photo Archive - T-AK-253 Private Joe E. Mann - T- AGM-4 Richfield

 

Victory ships
Ships built in Richmond, California
1945 ships
World War II merchant ships of the United States
Ships of the United States Army
Boulder Victory-class cargo ships
Missile range instrumentation ships of the United States Navy
Richfield
Cold War auxiliary ships of the United States
Suisun Bay Reserve Fleet
Maritime vessels related to spaceflight